Ingedore Grünfeld Villaça Koch (22 September 1933 — 15 May 2018) was a Brazilian linguist known for her work on text linguistics. She was a professor at the University of Campinas for almost three decades and an emerita researcher of the Brazilian National Council for Scientific and Technological Development. Koch is considered "one of the most respected figures of Brazilian linguistics" and her works are viewed as fundamental to the development of text linguistics in Brazil. She was one of the founders of the Latin American Association of Discourse Studies.

Selected bibliography 
 Argumentação e linguagem. São Paulo: Cortez, 1984. 
 A coerência textual. São Paulo: Contexto, 1989. (with Luiz Carlos Travaglia)
 A coesão textual. São Paulo: Contexto, 1989. 
 O texto e a construção dos sentidos. São Paulo: Contexto, 1997. 
 Desvendando os segredos do texto. São Paulo: Cortez, 2002.
 Introdução à linguística textual. São Paulo: Martins Fontes, 2004.
 Ler e compreender: os sentidos do texto. São Paulo: Contexto, 2006. (with Vanda Maria Elias)
 Intertextualidade: diálogos possíveis. São Paulo: Cortez, 2007. (with Anna Christina Bentes and Mônica Magalhães Cavalcante)

Editor 
 Gramática do português culto falado no Brasil: a construção do texto falado. Campinas: Unicamp, 2006. (with Clélia Cândida Abreu Spinardi Jubran)

Homages 
 Souza, Edson Rosa Francisco de; Penhavel, Eduardo; Cintra, Marcos Rogério (eds.). Linguística Textual: interfaces e delimitações. Homenagem a Ingedore Grünfeld Villaça Koch. São Paulo: Cortez, 2017.

References

External links 
Koch's Google Scholar page

1933 births
2018 deaths
Linguists from Brazil
Women linguists
Communication scholars